Calahoo is a hamlet in Alberta, Canada within Sturgeon County.

The hamlet is located in Census Division No. 11 and in the federal riding of Westlock-St. Paul. It is named after the Michel Calihoo Reserve established in 1878 on 25,600 acres under Treaty 6.

Demographics 

Notable residents 

 NHL hockey player and Stanley Cup winning coach Craig Berube
 NHL hockey prospect Ian Mitchell
 U Sports Player and 2022 Canada West Universities Athletic Association Champion, Ireland Perrott Power forward (ice hockey) for the UBC Thunderbirds women's ice hockey,

See also 
List of communities in Alberta
List of designated places in Alberta
List of hamlets in Alberta

References

External links
Calahoo - community website

Hamlets in Alberta
Designated places in Alberta
Sturgeon County